Idylwood is a census-designated place (CDP) in Fairfax County, Virginia, United States. The population was 17,954 as of the 2020 census. It originally developed as a suburban community along the route of the Washington and Old Dominion Railroad, and later along Virginia State Route 7. The construction of the Capital Beltway in the 1960s, and I-66 and the Orange Line of the Washington Metrorail system in the 1980s, as well as the concurrent development of nearby Tysons Corner into Washington's leading suburban business district, led to the development of several apartment, townhouse, and small-lot single-family housing complexes, as well as the high-rise Idylwood Towers condominium, in the portion of Idylwood lying to the north of I-66. The area to the south of I-66 remains primarily large-lot single-family.

Geography
Idylwood is located in eastern Fairfax County at  (38.889722, −77.205920). It is bordered to the east by the city of Falls Church, to the north by Pimmit Hills and Tysons Corner, to the west by Dunn Loring, to the southwest by Merrifield, and to the south by West Falls Church. The Capital Beltway forms the western border of the CDP, Virginia Route 7 (Leesburg Pike) forms the northern border, and U.S. Route 29 (Lee Highway) forms the southern border.

Demographics

As of the census of 2000, there were 16,005 people, 6,560 households, and 3,831 families residing in the CDP. The population density was 5,618.0 people per square mile (2,168.3/km2). There were 6,727 housing units at an average density of 2,361.3/sq mi (911.3/km2). The racial makeup of the CDP was 62.69% White, 6.93% African American, 0.32% Native American, 19.21% Asian, 0.06% Pacific Islander, 7.09% from other races, and 3.71% from two or more races. Hispanic or Latino of any race were 16.38% of the population.

There were 6,560 households, out of which 26.6% had children under the age of 18 living with them, 45.8% were married couples living together, 8.7% had a female householder with no husband present, and 41.6% were non-families. 29.0% of all households were made up of individuals, and 4.3% had someone living alone who was 65 years of age or older. The average household size was 2.44 and the average family size was 3.04.

In the CDP, the population was spread out, with 19.7% under the age of 18, 9.4% from 18 to 24, 42.2% from 25 to 44, 21.5% from 45 to 64, and 7.2% who were 65 years of age or older. The median age was 33 years. For every 100 females, there were 100.6 males. For every 100 females age 18 and over, there were 98.9 males.

The median income for a household in the CDP was $66,895, and the median income for a family was $74,103. Males had a median income of $50,107 versus $44,449 for females. The per capita income for the CDP was $34,485. About 4.0% of families and 5.8% of the population were below the poverty line, including 7.0% of those under age 18 and 3.4% of those age 65 or over.

Economy
The firm USIS had its headquarters in Idylwood.

Education
Fairfax County Public Schools operates public schools serving Idylwood. George C. Marshall High School is in Idylwood.

Parks and recreation
The Fairfax County Park Authority operates the Jefferson District Golf Course in the southwest corner of the CDP. Idylwood Park, in the western part of the CDP north of I-66 and east of the Beltway, is a county park with baseball, softball, and soccer fields, plus basketball and tennis courts.

References

Census-designated places in Fairfax County, Virginia
Census-designated places in Virginia